The 1953 Philippine presidential and vice presidential elections were held on November 10, 1953. Former Defense Secretary Ramon Magsaysay was elected President of the Philippines, defeating Incumbent Elpidio Quirino in his run for a second full term. His running mate Senator Carlos P. Garcia defeated Quirino's running mate Senator José Yulo. Incumbent Vice President Fernando Lopez did not run for re-election. With Magsaysay's election as president, he became the first elected president that did not come from the Senate.

Summary
After seven years of Liberal rule, the Nacionalista Party laced a strong presidential candidate to end the regime.

Nacionalista Party

Former President and then-Senator  Jose P. Laurel initially had intentions to seek the NP's nomination for president in 1953 but announced he is spiritually tired. He then proposed to adopt Secretary of National Defense Ramon Magsaysay, whose successful anti-insurgency and anti-communist initiatives had strained his relations with President Quirino and the LP.

Senate President Camilo Osías sought the presidential nomination but ultimately lost to Magsaysay. Senator Carlos P. Garcia of Bohol was picked to be his running-mate.

Liberal Party

The Liberal Party renominated President Elpidio Quirino and former House Speaker and Liberal Party President José Yulo for president and vice-president respectively.

Following the nomination, Philippine Ambassador to Washington Carlos P. Romulo and his men walked out of the LP convention and formed the Democratic Party. The DP then nominated Romulo for the presidency and supported the re-election of Vice President Fernando Lopez.

What was supposed to be a three-way race was reduced to a battle between the ruling Liberals against the Nacionalistas after the DP withdrew in support of Magsaysay, resulting in the Nacionalista-Democrata-Nationalist Citizens’ Party (NCP) coalition.

Results

President
Magsaysay carried most of the provinces except Ilocos Norte, Ilocos Sur, La Union, Tawi-Tawi, Sulu and Abra in which Ilocos Sur is a bailiwick and home province of President Quirino.

Vice-President 
Garcia also carried the provinces who voted for Magsaysay except for Isabela, Capiz and Sulu who voted for Yulo. The provinces who voted for
President Quirino also voted for Yulo.

See also

 1953 Philippine Senate election
 1953 Philippine House of Representatives elections
 Commission on Elections
 Politics of the Philippines
 Philippine elections
 President of the Philippines
 3rd Congress of the Philippines

References

External links
 The Philippine Presidency Project
 Official website of the Commission on Elections

1953
1953 elections in the Philippines